The Samara Valles are an elongated set of channels featuring an old valley in the middle of the Margaritifer Sinus quadrangle on Mars. It is located at approximately 25.1° south latitude and 19.1° west longitude.  They extend 615 km long and were named after the ancient Roman name for modern Somme River, France in 1976.

References

Valleys and canyons on Mars
Memnonia quadrangle
Margaritifer Sinus quadrangle